Lois Marie Sheffield played briefly for the South Bend Blue Sox of the All-American Girls Professional Baseball League in 1952. She was born June 15, 1933 in Wellington, Ohio and died in Wellington on November 17, 2014.

References 

1933 births
2014 deaths
Baseball players from Ohio
People from Wellington, Ohio
All-American Girls Professional Baseball League players
21st-century American women